Von hier aus – Zwei Monate neue deutsche Kunst in Düsseldorf (Up from here – Two months of new German art in Düsseldorf) is the title of an art exhibition from 29 September 1984 to 2 December 1984. It was organised by the city of Düsseldorf and the Gesellschaft für aktuelle Kunst Düsseldorf e.V. and was curated by Kasper König.

The exhibition showed the best of Contemporary German Art and wrote art history. The venue was Hall 13 of the Messe Düsseldorf, designed by the Austrian architect Hermann Czech. The green neon lettering used for the exhibition "Von hier aus" bore the handwriting of Joseph Beuys.

Participants 

 Marina Abramović (Video)
 Ina Barfuss
 Georg Baselitz
 Lothar Baumgarten
 Thomas Bayrle
 Bernd and Hilla Becher
 Joseph Beuys
 Bernhard Johannes Blume
 Jürgen Bordanowicz
 George Brecht
 Marcel Broodthaers
 Klaus vom Bruch (Video)
 Werner Büttner
 Holger Bunk
 Walter Dahn
 Hanne Darboven
 Jiří Georg Dokoupil
 Gerald Domenig
 Felix Droese
 Rainer Fetting
 Robert Filliou
 Lili Fischer
 Günther Förg
 Katharina Fritsch
 Nikolaus Gerhart
 Ludwig Gosewitz
 Hans Haacke
 Eva Hesse
 Antonius Höckelmann
 Rebecca Horn
 Thomas Huber
 Jörg Immendorff
 Katja Ka
 Axel Kasseböhmer
 Gerard Kever
 Hubert Kiecol
 Anselm Kiefer
 Martin Kippenberger
 Per Kirkeby
 Astrid Klein
 Arthur Köpcke
 Imi Knoebel
 Thomas Lange
 Silke Leverkühne
 Markus Lüpertz
 Peter Mell
 Gerhard Merz
 Olaf Metzel
 Reinhard Mucha
 Christa Näher
 Group Normal (Peter Angermann, Jan Knap, Milan Kunc)
 Marcel Odenbach (Video)
 Albert Oehlen
 Markus Oehlen
 Nam June Paik
 Blinky Palermo
 A. R. Penck
 Sigmar Polke
 Gerhard Richter
 Dieter Roth
 Reiner Ruthenbeck
 Ulrich Rückriem
 Salomé
 Tomas Schmit
 Thomas Schütte
 Andreas Schulze
 Manfred Stumpf
 Norbert Tadeusz
 Herman de Vries
 Thomas Wachweger
 Andy Warhol

Literature 
 Kasper König (publ.) and Karin Thomas (edit.), Ulrich Look and others (texts): von hier aus – Zwei Monate neue deutsche Kunst in Düsseldorf. Exhibition catalogue, DuMont, Cologne 1984,  (472 pages).
 Ereignis im Niveau von Westkunst und Zeitgeist. In: Art Magazin. 10/1983 (Szeemann planned as head).
 von hier aus Rekord Versuch in Halle 13. In: Art Magazin. 10/1984 (construction report).
 Die Kunst-Landschaft im Container. In: Art Magazin. 11/1984 (22.000 visitors in the first few days).
 Deutsche Kunst – schamlos, nationalistisch und nazihaft? In: Art Magazin. 2/1985 (criticism from a french cultural official).
 Kraftakt mit Deutschkunst. In: Westermanns Monatshefte. 12/1984, S. 108.
 Düsseldorf: „von hier aus“ – Zeitgenössische deutsche Kunst. In: PAN – Unsere herrliche Welt., publisher: Burda. 11/1984, p. 80–86.

Film  
The exhibition inspired the filmmaker Peter Herrmann to the video film "Von hier aus: neue deutsche Kunst in Düsseldorf", 45 Minutes, Munich, 1984, Artcom. The Film contains interviews with the artists Bernhard Johannes Blume, Tomas Schmit, Joseph Beuys, Jörg Immendorff, Salomé, Dieter Roth and the curator Kasper König.

References

External links 
 Von hier aus, Düsseldorf, kunstaspekte.de

Art exhibitions in Germany
1984 in West Germany
Culture in Düsseldorf
History of Düsseldorf